Australia participated at the first and only Paralympic Games for Persons with Mental Handicap held in Madrid, Spain from 15–22 September 1992. The Games followed the 1992 Summer Paralympics held in Barcelona, Spain. 

1600 athletes from 75 countries from competed in 5 sports – athletics, basketball, futsal, swimming and table tennis. Australian Team comprised 51 athletes and 18 officials. It competed in all sports except table tennis.

Australia finished first on the medal tally with 31 medals – 13 gold, 10 silver and 8 bronze medals.  Russell Torrance was the male team captain and Sarah-Jane Schulze was the women's team captain.

Swimmer Joseph Walker won nine gold medals and newspaper reports likened his medal success to multiple Olympic gold medalist Mark Spitz. Simmers Joshua Hofer and Rene Hardenbol won five gold medals. Women's basketball team known as the Pearls won the gold medal.

When the athletes from Madrid arrived home they were specifically invited and enjoyed the impressive public reception in Sydney. Marie Little described what this meant to those who were involved in the Madrid competition: 
I don’t think any participant will experience a similar feeling ever – the superb Fairstar dinner and the unbelievable Tickertape Parade were mind blowing – my heart was pumping, my eyes misty, my throat choked – in the crowd British Airways staff, bankers and paper sellers, little kids and their mums and dads, people in wheelchairs and bouncing babies – bands and music, sunshine and cheers. Little concluded: ‘Thanks to all for thanking the Paralympians’.

Medalists

Administration
Chef de Mission – Marie Little, General Team Manager – Jan Sutherland, Administrator – Colleen Bennett, Media Director – Paul Griffiths 
Doctor – Susan White, Physiotherapist – Barbara Denson
.

Events

Athletics
Athletics team: 12 athletes. 
Women – Madelyn Ehlers, Kaye Freeman, Norma Koplick, Racquel Nugent, Anne Walsh 
Men – Wayne Bauer, Anton Flavel, Paul Mitchell, Jason Newman, Michael Stevens,  Russell Torrance, Wayne Wright 
Coach – Scott Goodman, Robyn Hanson (Assistant) ; Manager – Wendy Ey

Results: Six athletes won medals with Anton Flavel winning one gold and two bronze medals.

Basketball

Basketball teams: 20 athletes. 
Women (Pearls) – Lorraine Archer, Tanya Aitchison, Donna Burns, Gladys Delaney, Melissa Gallacher, Fiona Hinds, Annette Kelly, Tina Kenna, Christine Humphries, Alice Toogood Coach – Margaret Sheriff; Manager – Robyn Smith

Results: defeated France 48-27 (Donna Burns 22 points); defeated Greece 47 – 32 (Donna Burns 31 points); defeated Brazil 65 – 14 (Donna Burns 36 points, Christine Humphries 13 points) ; defeated Great Britain 60 – 19 (Annette Kelly 18 points, Alice Toogood 12 points, Donna Burns 12 points). Final – defeated Greece 53 – 21 (Donna Burns 24 points, Christine Humphries 14 points, Alice Toogood 8 points, Annette Kelly 7 points).
When the Australian women's basketball team won the gold medal, the Canberra Times reported that: ‘the women's 53-21 drubbing of Greece was Australia's first medal win in Olympic or Paralympic Basketball’.

Men (Boomerangs) – Michael Aitchison, Michael Glover, David Henry, Tony Hopewell, Mark Konings, John Lettice, Rodney Meddings, Lee Medwin, Dean Papworth, John Wright Coach – Mark Walker (Head), Tony Guihot (Assistant)

Results: defeated Jordan 131-13 ; defeated Great Britain 65 – 20 (David Henry 28 points, Tony Hopewell 10 points); lost Dominican Republic 54-111 (Tony Hopewell 20 points, David Henry 14 points); lost 19-137 Puerto Rico. Team finished 7th.

Futsal
Futsal team: 10 athletes. 
Team – Jurgen Berens, Stephen Choat, John Fitter, Mark Harvey, Rob Lewis, Luis Marcellino, Willy Moen, Raymond Neaves, John Ruiz, Tony Thompson Coaches – Terry Pearce (Head), Jack De Cesco (Assistant), Manager – Bruce Drake.

Results: defeated Czecho-Slovakia 5-1 (Mark Harvey 1, Stephen Choat 1, John Fitter 1,  Rob Lewis 1, John Ruiz 1) ; lost Germany 3-7 (John Ruiz 2, Mark Harvey 1); defeated Colombia 6-0 (Ray Neaves 2, Mark Harvey 2, John Ruiz 2); lost Greece 0-5.

Swimming
 
Swimming team: 9 athletes.  
Women – Brigit Bromhead, Sarah Jane Schulze, Stacey Smith, Justine Van Eyssen  
Men – Jason Cooper, Rene Hardenbol, Joshua Hofer, Tim Krahe, Joseph Walker 
Coaches – John Boland (Head), Mark Lucas (Assistant) ; Manager – Jill Gates

Results: Australia finished first on the swimming medal tally winning 23 medals – 11 gold, 7 silver and 5 bronze medals. Joseph Walker won nine gold medals out of nine events which at the time was unmatched in Australia's Paralympic history. Joshua Hofer won eleven medals including five gold. Rene Hardenbol won seven medals including five gold. The Men's relay team won four gold medals in world record time. The women's relay team one a silver medal and two bronze medals.

Controversy
The most controversial dimension of the Madrid Games is their lack of formal recognition as an official Paralympic Games, even though the belief at the time was that the Madrid Games were part of the Summer Paralympic Games movement. For example, the Official Report by the Chef de Mission of the Australian team and AUSRAPID official, Marie Little, was entitled ‘Australian Paralympic Team Madrid’ and her opening comments reinforce the belief that the Madrid Games were part of the Paralympics: ‘The historical coming together of elite athletes with a disability [on the] Australian Team, albeit competing at two locations in the 1992 Summer Paralympics, Barcelona and Madrid, was a great achievement’. Furthermore, when the Queen's Birthday Awards were announced in 1993, the successes of athletes with an intellectually disability were acknowledged by OAMs with the dedication: ‘for service to sport as a gold medallist at the Paralympic Games, Madrid, 1992’.  It is clear from these examples that Australian administrators, officials, competitors and media at the time assumed that the Madrid Games were part of the official Paralympic Games. Unfortunately the IPC does not officially recognise the Madrid Games and, consequently, does not acknowledge the competing athletes as Paralympians.

See also
 Australia at the Paralympics
 Australia at the 1992 Summer Paralympics in Barcelona
 Images of the Australian Team at the Madrid Games

References

1992 Summer Paralympics
Australia at the Paralympics
1992 in Australian sport